Assel Jakayeva (born 14 March 1980) is a former Kazakhstan water polo player. She was part of the Kazakhstani team at the  2013 World Aquatics Championships in Barcelona, Spain, and competed at two Olympic Games.

At club level, she played for Greek team Olympiacos, with whom she reached the final of the LEN Trophy in 2008. She also played for Olympiacos in 2013, playing in the Greek Championship finals.

See also
 Kazakhstan at the 2013 World Aquatics Championships

References

Kazakhstani female water polo players
Living people
People from Taraz
1980 births
Water polo players at the 2000 Summer Olympics
Water polo players at the 2004 Summer Olympics
Olympic water polo players of Kazakhstan
Asian Games medalists in water polo
Olympiacos Women's Water Polo Team players
Water polo players at the 2014 Asian Games
Asian Games bronze medalists for Kazakhstan
Medalists at the 2014 Asian Games
Kazakhstani expatriate sportspeople in Greece
21st-century Kazakhstani women